This is a list of characters of the manga series Beastars.

Main characters

Legoshi

, 17 years old at the start of the story but turns 18 years old in Volume 14, is a towering gray wolf. A second-year student, Legoshi works as a member of the drama club's stage crew, and enjoys watching tragic stories performed despite never having had to directly participate in them. He attempts to hide his more terrifying traits in order to better acquaint his herbivorous classmates. He takes it upon himself to solve the murder of Tem. Generally conflicted with his status as a carnivore, Legoshi wishes to suppress his predatory desires which become even more complicated as he develops confused feelings towards Haru. Legoshi also has a complicated past, having mostly been raised by his Komodo dragon maternal grandfather Gosha, as Legoshi's hybrid wolf-Komodo dragon mother Leano had mostly withdrawn from life and committed suicide when Legoshi was 12. Legoshi inherited Gosha's Komodo dragon eyes with small pupils and an immunity to Komodo dragon venom, though Legoshi himself is not venomous. Jack knows about Legoshi's heritage, but few others do, and at school Legoshi is registered only as a gray wolf.

Itagaki had first conceptualized a wolf character while she attended junior high school; the design ideas remained similar, but over time she had different ideas for the character's story. Itagaki stated that she chose to make a wolf character as their similarity to dogs make them familiar to readers and that wolves' "sneaking around" makes them "cute". The name "Legoshi" refers to actor Bela Lugosi while she used Mathieu Amalric as a model for Legoshi's face. She stated "I sometimes think of Kenichi Matsuyama when I'm drawing the body."

Haru

, a third-year, is the lone member of Cherryton's gardening club and general outcast of the school due to her promiscuity. As a white dwarf rabbit, she often finds herself being treated as a fragile individual by society and wants to be validated as a person; she feels that having sex is the only way she can feel in control of herself. Haru tends to keep people at a distance, even those like Legoshi and Louis who wish to become closer with her.

Louis

 the red deer, 18 at the start of the story, is a third-year student at Cherryton and star actor of the school's drama club. Prideful and confident, Louis has a dream to become the next Beastar. He tends to look down upon those around him and assert his dominance even as an herbivore surrounded by carnivores. Though typically manipulative for his own desires, Louis has shown kindness and admiration (especially with Legoshi) that evolves over the course of the story. He has been romantically entangled with Haru.

Itagaki gives the character a "feminine" appearance, and that of the characters as of Volume 2 he "is the most difficult character[...] to draw" due to issues in making him show emotional characteristics, adding that she did not have difficulty drawing the actual parts of the character. Itagaki stated that she chose the name "Louis" due to its upper class connotations.

Juno

 is a first-year female gray wolf student and new member of the drama club who falls in love with Legoshi at first sight after he protects her from bullies, having heard of him prior to meeting him. She is determined to win his heart and become a Beastar alongside him, to create a new peaceful era for all carnivores together.

Gohin

 is a giant panda who works as a psychiatrist and back-alley doctor, who treats and rehabilitates carnivores whose predatory instincts start to overtake them. He first encounters Legoshi when he passes out in the Black Market, and at first assumes that Legoshi is one of many carnivores succumbing to their feral instincts, but soon develops something of a friendship with him, eventually becoming a mentor of sorts to him.

Cherryton Academy

Cherryton Academy students

Jack is a Labrador Retriever and also Legoshi's closest friend. The two have been acquaintances since their childhood. He is very friendly and wants the best for Legoshi, supporting him no matter what.

Bill is a Bengal tiger and second-year student at Cherryton Academy. He is also a member of the drama club's acting division and desires to become the next Beastar in order to prove the worth of all carnivores. He even comes to view Legoshi as a rival in terms of acting skill.

An Old English Sheepdog and friend of Legoshi's who lives in the same dorm.

A fennec fox and friend of Legoshi's who lives in the same dorm.

A spotted hyena and friend of Legoshi's who lives in the same dorm.

A coyote and friend of Legoshi's who lives in the same dorm.

A pelican and head director of the drama club.

Kai is a mongoose. Formerly part of the drama club acting team, he is demoted by Louis to working as a stagehand and supporting the actors of the club.

Els is an Angora goat who was the object of Tem's affection. She initially feared Legoshi following Tem's murder, but she changed her mind and forgave the wolf when he gave her Tem's love letter.

A third-year peafowl and the stage crew leader of the drama club.

An anteater member of the drama club's stage crew.

A third-year leopard and a high ranked member of the drama club serving as the choreographer.

A bald eagle second-year student and friend to both Legoshi and Bill.

Ellen is a second-year plains zebra student at Cherryton Academy. She is a member of the drama club who holds great respect from the herbivore side (though not nearly as much as Louis). She is shown to be easily scared of carnivores and is the first to blame one of them for Tem's death.

A paranoid Harlequin rabbit student at Cherryton Academy in Haru's grade who believes herself an endangered species and enjoys belittling Haru as inferior to her.

A Leghorn chicken student at Cherryton High School who sits next to Legoshi because the seats are arranged alphabetically. Every Wednesday, she sells her eggs to the school store, where Legoshi buys eggs from to make egg sandwiches. Although they seldom interact with one another, Legom appreciates Legoshi's affinity for her eggs.

Tem is an alpaca who was mysteriously murdered. Before his death, he had feelings for Els and made a love letter (which Legoshi knew about and gave to Els afterward). Later in the series, the murderer is revealed amidst plenty of intrigue.

Zoe is a goat and member of Cherryton Academy's drama club.

Tao is a black panther second-year student at Cherryton Academy as well as a member of the drama club.

Pina is a Dall sheep first-year student and a new member of the drama club.

Cherryton Academy faculty

The Siberian tiger who is the headmaster of Cherryton Academy who is also a member of the All-Organism Council that helps in selecting new Beastars each year.

An unnamed female mandrill who is in charge of the carnivore male dormitory at Cherryton Academy.

A very long rattlesnake who is the security guard of Cherryton Academy and has become fascinated by Legoshi. Her name - "Six Eyes" - refers to the eye-like markings on her body.

Civilians

The unnamed lion mayor who selfishly ignores any negative behavior of other carnivores (especially lions) for the sake of preserving the peace. He admits to spending an exorbitant amount of money on plastic surgery to make himself look more like an herbivore for the sole purpose of appearing less threatening, and therefore more "electable" like replacing his fangs with dull dentures, enlarging his eyes, and having his shoulder width reduced. The mayor only kept his large hands and claws unchanged because they are liked by his wife.

A red deer who is the owner and head of The Horns Conglomerate. Being infertile and in need of having a successor, he adopted Louis from the Back Market Alley when the latter was very little.

A 54-year-old male Komodo dragon who is Legoshi's maternal grandfather and only living relative. In Gosha's teen years, he was best friends and police partners with Yahya, and they were both candidates to become the new Sublime Beastar. But Gosha fell in love with Toki, a gray wolf, and her unplanned hybrid pregnancy prompted Gosha to give up that dream and focus on family life. Venomous species were not allowed to marry non-venomous species, but Gosha and Toki nevertheless raised Leano as their daughter until Toki's tragic death, and later Gosha raised his grandson, Legoshi, mostly by himself after Leano had become increasingly withdrawn and later killed herself. Gosha pays for Legoshi's tuition to attend Cherryton Academy until Legoshi drops out, and tracks down and reunites with his grandson because of this. Legoshi's brushes with the criminal justice system also brings Yahya back into Gosha's life. Gosha is a kind and loving grandfather, but also a formidable brawler determined to protect his family.

A 51-year-old male horse and the reigning Sublime Beastar. As a teenager he was Gosha's best friend and police partner, and they had planned to become Beastars together, and Yahya subsequently came to resent Gosha for abandoning his role in that dream to start a family after Gosha's wolf girlfriend Toki became pregnant. Since then, Yahya takes a dim view of interspecies relationships and hybrids including Gosha's family, and comes to single out Legoshi as the living symbol of Gosha's unforgiven betrayal. Whereas most Beastars became involved in the media or politics to help unite society, Yahya proves to be a more reclusive Beastar, acting mainly as an independent vigilante with police contacts and generous public funding. In this, Yahya does frequently legitimately fight for social justice by stopping criminals and opposing workplace exploitation. But he has also committed some horrifying acts, such as killing criminals and disposing of their corpses as fertilizer for his prized carrot garden.

A 29-year-old female Merino sheep who works at a sportswear company where the executives and most of the employees are carnivores. She chooses to move out of a posh condo and into a tiny unit at the Beast Apartments, and soon befriends the recent high school dropout Legoshi as her new neighbor.

A male spotted seal who has spent most of his life living in the ocean, but has become a expatriate living on land at the Beast Apartments where he hopes to translate land-dweller literature into the language of ocean-dwellers. Sagwan has customs considered shocking to land-dwellers, such as being naked whenever he's not in public (as is commonplace for inhabitants of the ocean even in public), but he is a very kind and friendly individual who quickly befriends both Seven and Legoshi as his new neighbors.

Antagonists

A brown bear student and the series' third arc's antagonist. However, the drug's side effects cause him to suffer from headaches and uncontrollable bouts of aggression, and it was during one of these seizures that he devoured his fellow drama club member and friend, Tem. Unable to cope with his guilt, he keeps deluding himself that Tem willingly agreed to be eaten, and he becomes viciously aggressive towards anyone—especially Legoshi—who challenges him. After his final confrontation with Legoshi, Riz surrenders to the authorities and goes to juvenile prison for his crimes, largely disappearing from the story until near the end of the series, when Pina is shown to have since become close to Riz and has been regularly visiting him.

Shishigumi
The Shishigumi are a back-alley gang of lions that are one of the four major criminal organizations that control the Black Market. Among its members are:

A lion who was the first leader of the Shihigumi and the main antagonist of the Meteor Festival arc. He kidnapped and tried to eat Haru before being defeated by Legoshi and killed by Louis.

Member of the Shishigumi that operates in the black market. Ibuki is a clever and calm Maasai lion among its reckless members. He has a strong father/son-like relationship with Louis.

Member of the Shishigumi who is a quick-tempered Indian lion that actively takes on the lead in turf wars. Aggressive but also likes to joke around.

A 24-year-old male gazelle/leopard hybrid who becomes the new leader of the Shishigumi crime syndicate and the primary antagonist of the final arc. He is a sociopathic serial killer who has killed dozens of animals since his young childhood, including his own mother. The top half of his face is like that of a gazelle with horns, but the bottom half is like that of a leopard with spots, and he usually wears a cloth face mask in public to pass as an ordinary herbivore so he can gain the confidence of his victims. Melon enjoys hurting people, and also experiences pain as pleasure and occasionally self-harms for this reason.

Dokugumi
The Dokugumi are a gang of Komodo dragons that are one of the four major criminal organizations that control the Black Market. Each of its members wear gas masks or anything that can cover their mouths.

A Komodo dragon that is the leader of the Dokugumi.

Inarigumi
The Inarigumi are a gang of female foxes that are one of the four major criminal organizations that control the Black Market.

A female red fox in an eyepatch who is the leader of the Inarigumi.

Madaragumi
The Madaragumi are a gang of leopards and jaguars that are one of the four major criminal organizations that control the Black Market.

A leopard who is the leader of the Madaragumi.

Notes

References

External links
 
 
 at Netflix
 at Viz Media

Beastars